Small-cell melanoma, also known as melanoma with small nevus-like cells, is a cutaneous condition, a tumor that contains variably-sized, large nests of small melanocytes with hyperchromatic nuclei and prominent nucleoli.

See also 
 Melanoma with features of a Spitz nevus
 List of cutaneous conditions

References 

Melanoma